Shelley railway station forms the western terminus of the Whistlestop Valley and serves the village of Shelley, West Yorkshire. England. There was never a station here on the Lancashire & Yorkshire Railway.

History
The trackbed was later rebuilt by the Kirklees Light Railway, now known as Whistlestop Valley as a minimum gauge railway.

References 

 https://web.archive.org/web/20080612172729/http://www.kirkleeslightrailway.com/content/home.php

Heritage railway stations in Kirklees
Railway stations built for UK heritage railways
Kirkburton